Kevin Alexander van Blomestein (16 January 1935 – 25 February 2006) was a Rhodesian field hockey player. He competed in the men's tournament at the 1964 Summer Olympics.

References

External links
 

1935 births
2006 deaths
Rhodesian male field hockey players
Olympic field hockey players of Rhodesia
Field hockey players at the 1964 Summer Olympics
People from Mufulira